Stanisław Domaniewski (died 1677) was a Roman Catholic prelate who served as Auxiliary Bishop of Włocławek (1653–1677) and Titular Bishop of Margarita (1653–1677).

Biography
On 9 Jun 1653, Stanisław Domaniewski was appointed during the papacy of Pope Innocent X as Auxiliary Bishop of Włocławek and Titular Bishop of Margarita.
On 15 Feb 1654, he was consecrated bishop by Pietro Vidoni, Bishop of Lodi, with Stanisław Jacek Święcicki, Auxiliary Bishop of Žemaičiai and Titular Bishop of Spiga, and Jan Rakowski, Auxiliary Bishop of Chelmno and Titular Bishop of Orthosias in Caria, serving as co-consecrators. 
He served as Auxiliary Bishop of Włocławek until his death in 1677.

While bishop, he was the principal co-consecrator of Adam Kos, Bishop of Chelmno (1658); Maciej Bystrom, Auxiliary Bishop of Chelmno and Titular Bishop of Argos (1661); and Gaspar Trizenieski, Auxiliary Bishop of Gniezno (1661)

References

External links and additional sources
 (for Chronology of Bishops) 
 (for Chronology of Bishops)  
 (for Chronology of Bishops) 
 (for Chronology of Bishops)  

17th-century Roman Catholic bishops in the Polish–Lithuanian Commonwealth
Bishops appointed by Pope Innocent X
1677 deaths